This is a list of DJ Awards winners and nominees.  The first DJ Awards ceremony was in 1998 and has run for 22 consecutive editions, the most recent being held in 2019. The awards are known internationally as the Oscars of the electronic music and DJ community.

Winners and nominees

1998
The 1st edition winners nominees and recipients were chosen from 8 categories.

1999
The 2nd edition winners nominees and recipients were chosen from 9 categories.

2000
The 3rd edition winners nominees and recipients were chosen from 11 categories.

2001
The 4th edition winners nominees and recipients were chosen from 9 categories.

2002
The 5th Edition edition winners nominees and recipients were chosen from 8 categories.

2003
The 6th edition winners nominees and recipients were chosen from 9 categories.

2004
The 7th edition winners nominees and recipients were chosen from 9 categories.'

2005
The 8th edition winners nominees and recipients were chosen from 10 categories.

2006
The 9th edition winners nominees and recipients were chosen from 10 categories.

2007
The 10th Anniversary edition winners nominees and recipients were chosen from 12 categories.

2008
The 11th edition winners nominees and recipients were chosen from 16 categories.

2009
The 12th edition winners nominees and recipients were chosen from 14 categories.

2010
The 13th edition winners nominees and recipients were chosen from 14 categories.

2011
The 14th edition winners nominees and recipients were chosen from 12 categories.

2012
The 15th edition winners nominees and recipients were chosen from 11 categories.

2013
The 16th edition winners nominees and recipients were chosen from 10 categories.

2014
The 17th edition winners nominees and recipients were chosen from 12 categories.

2015
The 18th edition winners nominees and recipients were chosen from 11 categories.

2016
The 19th edition winners nominees and recipients were chosen from 13 categories.

2017
The 20th edition winners nominees and recipients were chosen from 13 categories.

2018
Past winners included:

2019
The 22nd edition winners nominees and recipients were chosen from 14 categories.

Records

Most Wins
 Carl Cox - 16
 Armin van Buuren - 13
 Roger Sanchez - 8

Most consecutive wins

 Armin van Buuren - 8
 Carl Cox - 6 (2015-19)
 Carl Cox - 4 (2000-02)
 Steve Lawler - 3
 Luciano - 3
 Black Coffee - 3

Most nominations
 Carl Cox - 35
 Armin van Buuren - 20
 Richie Hawtin - 18
 Paul van Dyk - 15
 Erick Morillo - 14

Most consecutive nominations

 Carl Cox - 32
 Armin van Buuren - 20
 Erick Morillo - 14

Most wins in an individual category
Trance  Armin van Buuren - 9
Techno -  Carl Cox - 8
Tech House -  Luciano - 5
International -  Carl Cox - 5
House -  Roger Sanchez - 4
Tech House/Progressive -  Steve Lawler - 4
Electro House -  Deadmau5 - 3
Progressive House - * Sasha - 3

Most nominations in an individual category

Techno -  Carl Cox - 21
Trance -  Paul van Dyk - 15
House -  Roger Sanchez - 12
Tech House -  Luciano - 10
International -  Carl Cox - 11

References

External links
DJ Awards Official website
http://djawards.com/past-editions/

DJing
Spanish music awards
International music awards